Scoopula is a brand name of a spatula-like scoop utensil used primarily in experimental laboratories to transfer solids: to a weighing paper for weighing, to a cover slip to measure melting point, or a graduated cylinder, or to a watch glass from a flask or beaker through scraping. "Scoopula" is a registered trademark owned by Thermo Fisher Scientific. They are very often made of metal.

References

Laboratory equipment